The 1985 Rhode Island Rams football team was an American football team that represented the University of Rhode Island in the Yankee Conference during the 1985 NCAA Division I-AA football season. In their 10th season under head coach Bob Griffin, the Rams compiled a 10–3 record (5–0 against conference opponents), won the conference championship, and lost to Furman in the NCAA Division I-AA Quarterfinals.

Schedule

References

Rhode Island
Rhode Island Rams football seasons
Yankee Conference football champion seasons
Rhode Island Rams football